Jeong In-ji (December 28, 1396 – November 26, 1478) was a Korean Neo-Confucian scholar, historian who served as Vice Minister of Education or Deputy Chief Scholar (Head of Office for Special Advisors) during the reign of King Sejong the Great, Minister of Rites during the reign of King Munjong and Danjong, Left or Second State Councillor from 1453 to 1455 during the reign of King Danjong, and Chief State Councillor from 1455 to 1458 during the reign of King Sejo. He was nicknamed Hakyeokjae (학역재). He was from the Hadong Jeong clan (하동 정씨, 河東 鄭氏)

He is perhaps best known for having written the postscript of the Hunmin Jeongeum Haerye, the commentary on and explanation of the native alphabet Hangeul invented by King Sejong in 1443. He also contributed to the Goryeo-sa, the official history of the Goryeo dynasty, and the Yongbi Eocheon-ga (용비어천가).

His second son, Jeong Hyeon-jo, was married to Princess Uisuk, the second daughter of King Sejo of Joseon. His descendants would eventually have royal connections through their marriages.

Family
Father: Jeong Heung-in (정흥인, 鄭興仁) (1363–1436)
Grandfather: Jeong Eul-gwi (정을귀, 鄭乙貴)
Mother: Lady Jin of the Heungdeok Jin clan (정경부인 흥덕 진씨, 貞敬夫人 興德 陳氏) 
Grandfather: Jin Cheon-ui (진천의)
 Sibling(s)
Older sister: Lady Jeong of the Hadong Jeong clan (하동 정씨, 河東 鄭氏)
Brother-in-law: Jeong Bun (정분, 鄭苯) of the Jinju Jeong clan (진주 정씨, 晉州 鄭氏) (1394–1454)
Unnamed nephew 
 Wives and their children
 Lady Jo of the Hanyang Jo clan (한양 조씨)
 Son - Jeong Gwang-jo (정광조, 鄭光祖) (? - 1457)
 Daughter-in-law - Lady Ahn of the Juksan Ahn clan (죽산 안씨, 竹山 安氏) (? - 1456)
 Daughter - Lady Jeong of the Hadong Jeong clan 
 Son-in-law - Gwon Geum-seong (권금성, 權金成)
 Granddaughter - Lady Gwon of the Andong Gwon clan
 Lady Yi of the Gyeongju Yi clan (경주 이씨)
 Son - Jeong Hyeon-ju (정현조, 鄭顯祖) (1440 - 13 July 1504)
 Daughter-in-law - Princess Uisuk (의숙공주) (1441 - 1477)
 Daughter-in-law - Lady Yi of the Ugye Yi clan (우계 이씨) (? - 2 January ?)
 Grandson - Jeong Seung-su (승수, 承秀)
 Granddaughter-in-law - Lady Park of the Chungju Park clan (충주 박씨)
 Great-Grandson - Jeong Eon-baek (언백, 彦伯)
 Grandson - Jeong Seung-yeong (승영, 承英)
 Great-Grandson - Jeong Gwang (광, 廣)
 Grandson - Jeong Seung-jang (승장)
 Granddaughter-in-law - Lady Yi of the Jeonju Yi clan (전주 이씨)
 Granddaughter-in-law - Lady Shin of the Goryeong Shin clan (고령 신씨)
 Great-Grandson - Jeong Ryu (류, 瑠)
 Granddaughter - Lady Jeong of the Hadong Jeong clan 
 Grandson-in-law - Yi Gu (종성령 이구, 鍾城令 李球) of the Jeonju Yi clan (1494 - 1573)
 Great-Grandson - Yi Seong (이성, 李誠)
 Great-Grandson - Yi Bu (이부, 李溥)
 Grandson - Jeong Seung-hwa (승화, 承華)
 Great-Grandson - Jeong Chung (충, 忠)
 Great-Grandson - Jeong Shin (신, 臣)
 Grandson - Jeong Seung-ran (승란, 承蘭)
 Great-Grandson - Jeong Gyeong (경, 瓊)
 Great-Grandson - Jeong Yeong (영, 暎)
 Great-Grandson - Jeong Rim (림, 琳)
 Grandson - Jeong Seung-mu (승무, 承武)
 Great-Grandson - Jeong Jeok (적, 籍)
 Great-Grandson - Jeong Gan (간, 簡)
 Great-Grandson - Jeong Jeon (전, 箋)
 Grandson - Jeong Seung-beom (승범, 承範)
 Grandson - Jeong Seung-eun (승온, 承蘊)
 Grandson - Jeong Seung-dong (승동, 承董)
 Great-Grandson - Jeong Yo (요, 堯)
 Great-Grandson - Jeong Sun (순, 舜)
 Great-Grandson - Jeong Woo (우, 禹)
 Great-Grandson - Jeong Jik (직, 稷)
 Great-Grandson - Jeong Ki (기, 夔)
 Son - Jeong Song-jo (정숭조, 鄭崇祖) (1442 - 13 February 1503)
 Daughter-in-law - Lady Park of the Juksan Park clan (정경부인 죽산 박씨)
 Daughter-in-law - Lady Jo of the Pyeongyang Jo clan (정경부인 평양 조씨)
 Grandson - Jeong Seung-chong (승충, 承忠) (1467 - 1549)
 Granddaughter-in-law - Lady Yi of the Jeonju Yi clan (전주 이씨)
 Granddaughter-in-law - Lady Shin of the Pyeongsan Shin clan (평산 신씨)
 Great-Grandson - Jeong Eung-nyeon (응년, 應年)
 Great-Grandson - Jeong Dae-nyeon (대년, 大年)
 Great-Grandson - Jeong Gae-nyeon (개년, 開年)
 Grandson - Jeong Seung-hyo (승효, 承孝)
 Grandson - Jeong Seung-yeom (승염, 承廉)
 Grandson - Jeong Seung-geun (정승근, 鄭承謹)
 Grandson - Jeong Seung-ryeom (정승렴, 鄭承廉)
 Great-Granddaughter - Lady Jeong of the Hadong Jeong clan (1510 - 1587)
 Grandson - Jeong Seung-dong (승동, 承東)
 Son - Jeong Gyeong-jo (정경조, 鄭敬祖) (1455 - July 1498)
 Daughter-in-law - Lady Yi of the Jeonju Yi clan (전주 이씨)
 Daughter-in-law - Lady Yi of the Yeoju Yi clan (여주 이씨)
 Grandson - Jeong Seung-woo (정승우, 鄭承佑)
 Son - Jeong Sang-jo (정상조, 鄭尙祖) (1459 - 1491)
 Daughter-in-law - Lady Ahn of the Juksan Ahn clan (정경부인 죽산 안씨, 竹山 安氏) (1459 - 1521)
 Grandson - Jeong Se-ho (정세호, 鄭世虎) (1486 - 1563)
 Granddaughter-in-law - Lady Yi of the Gwangju Yi clan (정경부인 광주 이씨)
 Great-Grandson - Jeong Chang-Seo (정창서, 鄭昌瑞) (1519 - ?)
 Great Granddaughter-in-law - Lady Yi of the Jeonju Yi clan (전주 이씨, 全州 李氏)
 Great Granddaughter-in-law - Lady Kim of the Gwangsan Kim clan (광산 김씨)
 Great-Great-Granddaughter - Lady Jeong of the Hadong Jeong clan
 Great-Great-Great-Grandson-in-law - Jeong Dae-gil (정대길, 鄭大吉)
 Great-Grandson - Jeong Chang-Su (정창수, 鄭昌壽)
 Great-Granddaughter - Grand Internal Princess Consort Hadong (Hangul: 하동부대부인, Hanja: 河東府大夫人) (23 September 1522 - 24 June 1567)
 Great-Grandson - Jeong Hong-Su (정홍수, 鄭弘壽)

Books 

 Hunminjeongeum (훈민정음, 訓民正音)
 Hunminjeongeum yehae (훈민정음예해, 訓民正音例解)
 Hagyeokjaejip (학역재집, 學易齋集)
 Yeokdae yeokbeop (역대역법, 歷代曆法)
 Goryeosa (고려사, 高麗史)
 Goryeosa jeolyo (고려사절요, 高麗史節要)
 Yeokdae byeongyo (역대병요, 歷代兵要)
 Saryun ojip (사륜오집)
 Jachitonggam hunui (자치통감훈의, 資治通鑑訓義)
 Sejong sillok (세종실록, 世宗實錄)

In popular culture

Drama 
 Portrayed by Jeong Seung-hyeon in the 1984-1985 MBC TV series 500 Years of Joseon: The Ume Tree in the Midst of the Snow
 Portrayed by Lee Shin-jae in the 1990 KBS TV series Dance Toward the Broken Heavens
 Portrayed by Han In-su in the 1994 KBS TV series Han Myeong-hoe
 Portrayed by Park Woong in the 1998-2000 KBS TV series The King and Queen
 Portrayed by Lee Jin-woo in the 2008 KBS TV series The Great King, Sejong
 Portrayed by Park Hyuk-kwon in the 2011 SBS TV series Deep Rooted Tree.
 Portrayed by Woo Sang-jeon in the 2011-2012 JTBC TV series Insu, The Queen Mother
 Portrayed by Jeong Eui-gap in the 2016 KBS1 TV series Jang Yeong-sil.

Film 
 Portrayed by O Yeong-su in the play Tae in 1997 and 2007 
 Portrayed by Lee Jin-bok in the 2012 film The Majesty’s Spring

See also 
 Sejo of Joseon
 Sin Suk-ju
 Han Myeong-hoe
Han Hwak
King Seonjo of Joseon

External links 
 Jeons Inji's family home
 문성공 정인지의 생애
 문성공 정인지의 업적과 사상

References 

Pratt: 175 & 337

Lee Ki-baik: 193,198 & 201

1396 births
1478 deaths
Neo-Confucian scholars
15th-century Korean poets
Historians of Korea
Korean Confucianists